American River Airpark (IATA: RCN) is a privately owned airfield on Kangaroo Island in the Australian state of South Australia located in the locality of American River. The airport is privately owned and operated as part of a scenic flight service within Kangaroo Island Connect and is also used by Wrightsair.

Facilities 
The airfield has one runway.

Runway 1 is the main runway which is a dirt strip where almost all of the flights leave off of. The runway's heading is approximately 17/35.

See also
List of airports in South Australia

References 

Airports in South Australia
Kangaroo Island